Paper Planes is a 2015 Australian 3D children's drama film directed by Robert Connolly, which he co-wrote with Steve Worland and co-produced with Liz Kearney and Maggie Miles. The film stars Sam Worthington, David Wenham, Deborah Mailman, and Ed Oxenbould. The film tells a story about Dylan, a young boy who lives in Australia, who finds out that he has a talent for making paper planes and dreams of competing in the World Paper Plane Championships in Japan.

It opened in Australian cinemas on 15 January 2015 on 253 screens by Roadshow Films. It grossed A$9.61 million at the Australian box office by the end of its run. The story is loosely inspired by an episode of Australian Story called "Fly With Me", and was the centre of a second episode, "The Meaning of Life". Paper Planes was released on DVD and Blu-ray on 24 June 2015 by Roadshow Entertainment.

Cast 
 Sam Worthington as Jack Webber
 Ed Oxenbould as Dylan Webber
 Ena Imai as Kimi Muroyama
 Nicholas Bakopoulos-Cooke as Jason Jones
 Julian Dennison as Kevin
 David Wenham as Patrick Jones
 Deborah Mailman as Maureen Prescott
 Peter Rowsthorn as Mr. Hickenlooper
 Terry Norris as George "Grandpa" Webber

Production 
On 9 November 2013, filming had begun in Perth in Western Australia and in Tokyo with Robert Connolly directing. Sam Worthington, David Wenham, Julian Dennison, and Ed Oxenbould star in the film.

Principal photography took place in both country and metro Western Australia, though the film states the setting as being in New South Wales (given they "drive down to Sydney"). Locations used for filming include an abandoned school in Roleystone, an old house in Baldivis, HBF Stadium (previously known as Challenge Stadium until 2014), Whiteman Park, the Perth Zoo, and the Aviation Heritage Museum in Bull Creek.

Release 
Paper Planes was released in theaters throughout Australia on 15 January 2015, and on DVD and Blu-ray on 24 June 2015 by Roadshow Entertainment.

Critical response and box office 
This film holds an 85% approval rating on Rotten Tomatoes based on 26 reviews. By the end of its run, it had grossed A$9.61 million at the Australian box office. 
Simon Weaving of Screenwize called the film, "a wholesome, feel-good tale of a primary school underdog who dreams of getting to the world paper plane championships in Japan." 
Jim Schembri of 3AW wrote in his review, "In one of the great career gear shifts in recent memory, Melbourne director Robert Connolly, who gave us such searing dramas as The Bank, Three Dollars, and Balibo, delivers an adorable family film that is uplifting, warm, winning, and most of all, funny." 
Fiona Williams of sbs.com.au says, "there's a lot to like in Paper Planes'  ideas about ingenuity and resilience, and that may bode well for getting bums off the beach and onto seats in the film's late summer school holiday release period."

While the film performed strongly at the box office domestically in Australia, it was less successful in its international debut (U.K./Ireland,) opening at number 47 and earning £4,381 in its opening weekend (23–25 October 2015.)  The film was released in Spain on 1 January 2016 (the film's only European theatrical release as of February 2016) and opened at number 29 with a gross of US$7,577 from 21 screens, for a per-theater average of $361.

Awards

Soundtrack 
 "Paper Planes"
 "Beauty in the World"
 "Ready to Launch"
 "Flight Research"
 "My Journey Starts Here"
 "Dog Fight"
 "A Bird That Cannot Fly"
 "Pavane"
 "Take Your Positions"
 "Do Emus Dream of Flying?"
 "The Final Challenge"
 "Is There a Movie on This Flight?"
 "Tokyo by Night"
 "The Competition"
 "For as Long as it Takes"
 "Learn to Live"

Book 
Steve Worland, who co-wrote Paper Planes, novelised the screenplay into a best-selling book for young readers. It was published on 2 January 2015 through Puffin Books. It includes directions on how to fold a paper plane, photographs from the film, and notes about the production.

References

External links 

 
 Paper Planes scene clips and featurette at SBS Movies

2015 films
Australian children's drama films
Australian 3D films
Paper planes
Films scored by Nigel Westlake
Films shot in Perth, Western Australia
Films shot in Tokyo
Films set in Sydney
2015 drama films
2010s English-language films
Screen Australia films
Roadshow Entertainment films